The 2013 Camping World RV Sales 500 was a NASCAR Sprint Cup Series race held on October 20, 2013, at Talladega Superspeedway in Talladega, Alabama. Contested over 188 laps on the 2.66 mile superspeedway, it was the 32nd race of the 2013 Sprint Cup Series championship, and the sixth race in the Chase for the Sprint Cup. Jamie McMurray of Earnhardt Ganassi Racing won the race, breaking a 108 race winless streak, while Dale Earnhardt Jr. finished second. Ricky Stenhouse Jr., Paul Menard, and Kyle Busch rounded out the top five. The race had two caution flags, 20 leaders, and 52 lead changes, both of them season highs. This was the second straight Chase race to be won by a non-Chaser.

Report

Background

The track's turns are banked  at 33 degrees, while the front stretch, the location of the finish line, is 18 degrees. The back stretch, opposite of the front, is at only two degrees. The racetrack has a seating capacity for 109,000 spectators. Matt Kenseth was the defending race winner after winning the event during the 2012 race.

Practice and qualifying

Rain cancelled qualifying and Aric Almirola was awarded the pole based on his practice speed. Sam Hornish Jr. did not qualify due to lack of attempts.

Race summary
Jamie McMurray passed Jimmie Johnson with 15 laps to go. For the final 15 laps McMurray stumped runner-up Dale Earnhardt Jr. holding Earnhardt off for the rest of the race. Austin Dillon spent most of the final 50 laps in third place. On the final lap Dillon got tapped from behind by Ricky Stenhouse Jr. Dillon cart-wheeled over Casey Mears. Dale Earnhardt Jr. made a pass on Jamie McMurray and finished first, but McMurray took the win as Earnhardt had completed his pass after the caution came out. Officials confirmed 30 minutes after the race was over that McMurray was leader at the moment of caution.

Results

Qualifying

 Qualifying was canceled because of rain showers, prompting the grid to be set by first practice lap times.

Race results

Standings after the race
Drivers' Championship standings

Manufacturers' Championship standings

References

Camping World RV Sales 500
Camping World RV Sales 500
Camping World RV Sales 500
NASCAR races at Talladega Superspeedway